This is a list of notable alumni of the Hotchkiss School in Lakeville, Connecticut. Former pupils are known as Pythians (even entrance year) or Olympians (odd entrance year).

Dates listed are the graduation year.

Academia
Willard F. Enteman II (1955) –  Bowdoin College president
 Arthur Lehman Goodhart (1908) – Oxford’s University College master and legal scholar
 Alfred Whitney Griswold (1925) –  Yale University president
David Hawkins (1931) – science philosopher and Manhattan Project’s official historian
Benjamin Woods Labaree (1945) – Williams College dean
Leonard Woods Labaree (1915) – Yale history professor
Roger Sherman Loomis (1905) – Columbia English professor
Scotty McLennan (1966) – Stanford dean for religious life, inspiration for Doonesbury character Reverend Scot Sloan
 Jerome J. Pollitt (1953) – Yale art history professor
Walter W. Taylor (1931) – conjunctive archaeology founder
Nader Tehrani (1981) – dean of the Irwin S. Chanin School of Architecture of the Cooper Union
Christopher Winship (1968) – Harvard sociology professor

Business
 Jonathan Bush (1949) – George H. W. Bush's brother and investment banker
 William H. T. Bush (1956) – investment banker
 Roy D. Chapin, Jr. (1933) –American Motors CEO
 Granger K. Costikyan (1925) – Armenian-American banker
 Edsel Ford (1968) – Ford Motor Company executive
 Henry Ford II (1936) – Ford Motor Company executive
 William Clay Ford, Sr. (1943) – Ford Motor Company executive
 William Clay Ford, Jr. (1975) – Ford Motor Company executive
 Briton Hadden (1915) – Time co-founder
 Robert Lehman (1908) – Lehman Brothers executive
 David McCord Lippincott (1943) – McCann Erickson creative director and copywriter
 Raymond McGuire (1975) – former head of Investment Banking at Citigroup
 Henry Luce (1916) – Time co-founder
 Forrest Mars, Jr. (1949) – Mars, Inc. executive
 John Mars (1953) – Mars, Inc. executive
 Philip W. Pillsbury (1920) – Pillsbury Company executive
 John Shedd Reed (1935) –  Santa Fe Railway executive
 Harold Stanley (1904) – Morgan Stanley founder
 John L. Thornton (1972) – Goldman Sachs executive
 William von Mueffling (1986) - Cantillon Capital Management founder
 Evans Woollen III (1945) – architect, principal and founder of Woollen, Molzan and Partners, Indianapolis

Entertainment

Art and music
Peter Arno (1922) – The New Yorker cartoonist
John Crosby (1944) – founder and director of the Santa Fe Opera; recipient of National Medal of Arts
Edwin Denby (1919) – poet and dance critic
Peter Duchin (1954) – leader and organizer Peter Duchin Orchestras and Duchin Entertainment
Frederick "Dennis" Greene (1968) – founder and lead singer of Sha Na Na; professor, University of Dayton School of Law
Thomas Hoving (1949) – director of Metropolitan Museum of Art
Esko Laine (1980) – double bass player, Berlin Philharmonic Orchestra
Douglas Moore (1911) – Pulitzer Prize-winning composer
Gerald Clery Murphy (1907) - artist, socialite, CEO of Mark Cross
Scott Powell (1966) – member of the rock group Sha Na Na; orthopedic surgeon
Roswell Rudd (1954) – Grammy-nominated jazz trombonist
Samuel Wagstaff (1940)– art curator, museum director

Athletes
Edwin F. Blair (1920) – All-American lineman for the undefeated Yale's 1923 football team, attorney, corporate leader
Caitlin Cahow (2003) –  Olympic bronze and silver medalist in hockey
Luke Glendening – NHL forward
Matt Herr – forward who played for part of four NHL seasons
Fred Kammer (1930) – Olympic bronze medalist in hockey
Gina Kingsbury (2000) – two time Olympic gold medalist in hockey for Canada
Torrey Mitchell (2004) – NHL forward
Raymond W. "Ducky" Pond (1921) – Yale University football player and coach
Peter Revson – Formula One race car driver.
Shavar Thomas – Major League Soccer player for the Jamaica National Football Team

Film and television 
John G. Avildsen (1955) – film director Rocky, The Karate Kid
Max Carlish – documentary filmmaker; recipient of a BAFTA and an International Emmy Award
Elizabeth Chandler (1982) – screenwriterThe Sisterhood of the Traveling Pants, What A Girl Wants
Bradford Dillman (1947) – actor; A Certain Smile, Escape from the Planet of the Apes, The Way We Were
John H. Hammond (1929) – executive and producer at Columbia Records; discovered Bob Dylan, Bruce Springsteen
Leland Hayward (1920) – Hollywood and Broadway agent and producer
Peter H. Hunt (1957) – theater and television director, recipient of a Tony Award for the musical 1776
Allison Janney (1977) – Oscar and Emmy Award-winning actress
Mark Mays (1981) – Clear Channel Communications executive
Chris Meledandri (1977) – founder and CEO of Illumination Entertainment and 20th Century Fox Animation
Ben Mulroney (1993) – host of Canadian Idol
Burr Steers – filmmaker and actor
Fay Vincent (1958) – Columbia Pictures executive and 8th MLB Baseball Commissioner
Chris Wallace (1963) – prominent broadcast journalist
Tom Werner (1967)– co-founder of Carsey-Werner Company, whose productions include That '70s Show, 3rd Rock from the Sun, The Cosby Show

Writers and journalists 
José Camprubí (1897) – La Prensa owner
Tom Dolby (1994) – author and Ray Dolby’s son
Varian Fry (1926) – journalist and "the American Schindler"
John Hersey (1932) – 1945 Pulitzer Prize for Fiction winner, Yale’s Pierson College master
Lewis H. Lapham (1952) – editor of Harper's Magazine and Lapham's Quarterly
William Loeb (1923) – publisher of the Union Leader newspaper
Peter Matthiessen (1945) – 1979, 1980, and 2008 National Book Award winner
Archibald MacLeish (1911) – winner of 1933 and 1953 Pulitzer Prize for Poetry and 1959 Pulitzer Prize for Drama
Julia Quinn (1987) – romantic novelist
Tom Reiss (1982) – 2013 Pulitzer Prize for Biography winner
MacKenzie Scott (1988) – philanthropist, novelist, and Jeff Bezos's ex-wife

Government and diplomacy
 Victor Ashe (1963) – United States Ambassador to Poland
 Malcolm Baldrige, Jr. (1940) – United States Secretary of Commerce
 Richard S. Bodman (1955) – Assistant Secretary of the Interior for management and budget, Office of Management of Budget in the Executive Office of the President
 Donald B. Easum (1942) – United States Ambassador to Nigeria,  former United States Assistant Secretary of State
 Frederick Vanderbilt Field (1923) – political activist, staff member of Institute of Pacific Relations
 G. McMurtrie Godley (1935) – United States Ambassador to Laos and co-founder of the Glimmerglass Opera
 Hallett Johnson (1904) – diplomat, Ambassador to Costa Rica
 Winston Lord (1955) – United States Ambassador to China
 Livingston T. Merchant (1922) – United States Ambassador to Canada and Undersecretary of State for Political Affairs
 Clark T. Randt, Jr. (1964) – United States Ambassador to China
 Strobe Talbott (1954) – Deputy Secretary of State, journalist, diplomat, president of Brookings Institution
 Paul Warnke – Assistant Secretary of Defense for International Security Affairs
 Arthur K. Watson (1938) – United States Ambassador to France
 Charles Yost (1956) – United States Ambassador to the United Nations; Laos, Syria, and Morocco

Judiciary and law 
 Samuel H. Blackmer – Associate Justice of the Vermont Supreme Court
 Robert Bork (1944) – United States Solicitor General, Conservative legal scholar, judge
 Lisa Brown (1978) – lawyer,  General Counsel of the United States Department of Education, staff secretary to President Barack Obama
 Eli Whitney Debevoise (1917) – attorney and founder of Debevoise & Plimpton
 Peter Hall (1966) – judge, US Court of Appeals for the Second Circuit; former U.S. Attorney, District of Vermont
 Jon Ormond Newman (1949) – judge, United States court of appeals
 Potter Stewart (1933) – Justice of the US Supreme Court

Medicine and science
Alexandra Golby (1985) – neurosurgeon, professor of neurosurgery and radiology at Harvard Medical School
Charles Snead Houston (1931) – physician and early high altitude pulmonary edema researcher.
 Dickinson W. Richards Jr. (1913) – Nobel Prize laureate (Medicine).

Military
Thaddeus Beal (1935) – Under Secretary of the Army
Douglas Campbell (1913) – aviator; first aviator in an American unit to achieve the status of flying ace
Artemus Gates (1911) –  World War I hero, Under Secretary of the Navy
Roswell Gilpatric (1924) – assistant Secretary of the Air Force; Deputy Secretary of Defense
Frank O'Driscoll Hunter (1913) – chief of the First Air Force in World War II
Paul Nitze (1924) – Secretary of the Navy, co-founder of the Johns Hopkins University School of Advanced International Studies
Elliott B. Strauss (1921) – rear admiral, key Allied staff officer for the Invasion of Normandy

Ministry 
Margot Käßmann (1975) – bishop of Evangelical-Lutheran Church of Hanover Landesbischöfin, first chairwoman of Evangelical Church in Germany
Henry Knox Sherrill (1907) – Bishop of Massachusetts (1930-1947) and 20th Presiding Bishop of Episcopal Church

Politicians 
 R. Lawrence Coughlin (1946) – United States House of Representatives
 Charles Edison (1909) – Governor of New Jersey
 Sir Philip Goodhart (1944) – British politician
 Porter J. Goss (1956) – United States House of Representatives for Florida, Director of the CIA
 Ernest Gruening (1903) – Governor of Alaska, US Senator
 William Kirk Kaynor – member of the U.S. House of Representatives
 Lawrence M. Judd (1906) – Governor of Hawaii
 Robert D. Orr (1936) – Governor of Indiana
 William Warren Scranton (1935) – Governor of Pennsylvania, United States Ambassador to the United Nations
 Jerry Voorhis (1919) –  United States House of Representatives

References

Lists of American people by school affiliation
Lists of people by educational affiliation in Connecticut

Connecticut-related lists